The Royal Order of the Lion of Godenu is a dynastic Order of Merit in the sub-national kingdom of Godenu, Volta Region of Ghana.

The current Grand Master of the Order is the traditional ruler Togbe Osei III.

Medals and Grades 

The Order is awarded in five classes:
  Grand Cross (GCRLG)
  Grand Officer (GORLG)
  Commander (CRLG)
  Officer (ORLG)
  Knight (KRLG) or Dame (DRLG)
The Order is usually granted for life in all grades. Only rarely, at the Grand Cross level, may it be granted as an hereditary dignity to reward exceptional service to the Royal House.

In special cases, Grand Master may confer the title of Knight of the Grand Cross with Collar.

Privileges 

All members are entitled to use the honorary title of "Knight" or "Dame".

Recipients of the Grand Cross may use the prefix style of "His or Her Excellency". Grand Officers and Commanders may use the prefix style of "The Honourable".

Members are entitled to wear the Order's Insignia at the appropriate grade and may use the Order's Insignia in their heraldry.

See also 
 Royal Order of the Elephant of Godenu
 Orders, decorations, and medals of Ghana

External links 
 Official Website - Royal House of Godenu

References 

Orders, decorations, and medals of Ghana
Orders of chivalry in Africa